Vitter may refer to:

People
David Vitter, junior U.S. Senator from Louisiana
Jeffrey Vitter, 17th Chancellor of the University of Mississippi

Other
Vittra (folklore), singular form vitter, a creature found in Scandinavian folklore